Maamar Benguerba was the Algerian minister for labour and social affairs in the 1992 government of Belaid Abdessalam.

References

Living people
Year of birth missing (living people)
Place of birth missing (living people)
Government ministers of Algeria
20th-century Algerian politicians